Watubela is an archipelago in the Maluku Islands, east of Ceram and north of Kai Islands, southeast of the Gorong archipelago, and southwest of the Bomberai Peninsula of Papua, Indonesia.  It includes the islands of Watubela itself, Kesui (also called Kasiui) and Teor (also called Tio'or). The islands now form two separate districts (kecamatan) within the East Seram Regency of Maluku. Kesui Watubela District (also called Wakate District) includes Watubela and Kesui Islands, with a number of smaller islands; Teor District consists of the island of the same name.

The English naturalist Alfred Russel Wallace described the islands, which he called the Matabello Islands, in chapter 25 of his 1869 book The Malay Archipelago.

References

External links

Languages of Indonesia (Maluku)

Maluku Islands